James Vear Hansen (August 14, 1932 – November 14, 2018) was an American Republican politician from Utah, who was a member of the United States House of Representatives from 1981 to 2003.

Early life and education 
Hansen was born in Salt Lake City, graduating from the city's East High School. From 1951 until 1955, he served in the United States Navy. He attended the University of Utah, receiving a business degree from the school in 1961.

Career 
The same year that he left college, Hansen was elected to the Farmington City Council. He also worked as an insurance agent.

From 1973 until 1980, Hansen was a member of the Utah House of Representatives, serving as speaker of the house from 1979 until 1980. In 1980, he defeated K. Gunn McKay to represent . He faced off against McKay two more times, in 1986 and 1988, prevailing in both races.

Hansen retired on January 3, 2003. Hansen served as chairman of the Committee on Resources in his last term in the 107th Congress. Hansen ran for the governorship in 2004, but was defeated at the Republican convention by Jon Huntsman Jr. who went on to win the election. He was appointed a commissioner on the 2005 Base Realignment and Closure Commission.

When a portion of U.S. Route 89 in Weber County, Utah was upgraded to freeway standards, it was named the James V. Hansen Highway. The federal building in Ogden, Utah was renamed the James V. Hansen Federal Building in his honor in 2004.

Personal life 
Hansen died on November 14, 2018, at the age of 86.

References

External links

 

1932 births
2018 deaths
20th-century American politicians
21st-century American politicians
American businesspeople in insurance
Businesspeople from Salt Lake City
Latter Day Saints from Utah
Republican Party members of the Utah House of Representatives
Military personnel from Salt Lake City
People from Farmington, Utah
Politicians from Salt Lake City
Speakers of the Utah House of Representatives
United States Navy sailors
University of Utah alumni
Utah city council members
Republican Party members of the United States House of Representatives from Utah
20th-century American businesspeople
Members of Congress who became lobbyists